Whiterigg railway station served the village of Maddiston, North Lanarkshire, Scotland, from 1862 to 1930 on the Slamannan Railway.

History 
The station was opened in November 1862 by the Monkland Railways. It replaced , which was to the east. The station closed on 1 May 1930.

References

External links 

Disused railway stations in North Lanarkshire
Railway stations in Great Britain opened in 1862
Railway stations in Great Britain closed in 1930
1862 establishments in Scotland
1930 disestablishments in Scotland